Štěpán Kučera (born 11 June 1984 in Prague) is a Czech footballer who plays as a centre-back for SK Zbraslav.

Career 
Kučera began his professional career with AC Sparta Prague and was loaned to FK Jablonec 97 before moving to Club Brugge in July 2007.

In the 2008–2009 season he was out on loan to Sparta Prague due to several disappointing performances with Club Brugge the year before. For the 2009–2010 season he returned to Club Brugge.

In January 2014, Kučera resigned for Kazakhstan Premier League side FC Tobol.

References

External links
Štěpán Kučera at [[Football Association of the Czech Republic
|FAČR]] (in Czech)

1984 births
Living people
Czech footballers
Czech expatriate footballers
Czech Republic youth international footballers
Czech Republic under-21 international footballers
Footballers from Prague
Czech First League players
Belgian Pro League players
Kazakhstan Premier League players
FK Chmel Blšany players
FK Jablonec players
AC Sparta Prague players
Club Brugge KV players
K.S.V. Roeselare players
FC Tobol players
FC Irtysh Pavlodar players
SK Kladno players
FC Slavoj Vyšehrad players
Czech expatriate sportspeople in Belgium
Czech expatriate sportspeople in Kazakhstan
Expatriate footballers in Belgium
Expatriate footballers in Kazakhstan
Association football defenders